The Blue Mountains walking tracks are heritage-listed picnic areas, walking tracks and rest areas located in the Blue Mountains National Park, in the City of Blue Mountains local government area of New South Wales, Australia. It was built from 1880. The property is owned by the NSW Office of Environment and Heritage, an agency of the Government of New South Wales. It was added to the New South Wales State Heritage Register on 2 April 1999.

History 
The Blue Mountains National Park regained the top spot as the most popular New South Wales national park for domestic visitors in a 2014 survey. It received 4.2 million visitors in 2014, relegating Royal National Park to second place.

Description 
The following walking tracks form part of the heritage-listed items. The State Heritage Inventory (SHI) number below is the reference to the item number in the NSW National Parks and Wildlife Service (NPWS) s.170 Register.

Heritage listing 
As at 16 January 2017, the overall complex of Blue Mountains regional walking tracks was of National significance. It is distributed among dozens of individually designed cultural landscapes. These landscapes were planned for recreational purposes, at first by wealthy gentlemen on their private estates and later by community based trusts who administered grants from the NSW Government. There exists a full range of original construction types and track fabric and associated features such as shelter sheds, wells, railings and signage from the 1870s private tracks to the efforts of the Blue Mountains National Park Trust in the 1960s.

The blending of man-made and natural features in track construction was done in ways that reflect the aesthetics, technology and environmental values of the time. Many of the constructed features transcend their purely utilitarian functions and have considerable aesthetic appeal. The solutions of the early trustees and track makers to complex problems of design, particularly drainage issues and the use of stone have significant research value today. Due to the proximity of the reserves to Sydney and the early provision of mass transport links between Sydney and the Blue Mountains, the region's walking tracks have been the most significant facilitators of contact between urban Australians and the natural environment.

The Blue Mountains tourist industry grew largely to service people who desired an engagement with nature on the walking tracks. The tracks have been an important factor in the growth of conservation values in the community. Walkers have left a resource of written records, photographs and memories recording their impressions and emotional and spiritual experiences on the tracks that has historic significance as a record of Australians' changing relationships with nature. These relationships continue to evolve after over 100 years of continuous use of many tracks. People walking the tracks today can enjoy feelings of continuity and empathy with the walkers of the past as they use the same historic structures.

Blue Mountains walking tracks was listed on the New South Wales State Heritage Register on 2 April 1999.

See also 

Greater Blue Mountains Area

References

Bibliography

Attribution

External links

New South Wales State Heritage Register
Hiking and bushwalking tracks in the Blue Mountains (New South Wales)
Parks in New South Wales
Articles incorporating text from the New South Wales State Heritage Register
Tourist attractions in the Blue Mountains (New South Wales)